A transition metal thiosulfate complex is a coordination complex containing one or more thiosulfate ligands. Thiosulfate occurs in nature and is used industrially, so its interactions with metal ions are of some practical interest. Three binding modes are common: monodentate (κ1-), O,S-bidentate (κ2-),and bridging (μ-). Typically, thiosulfate complexes are prepared from thiosulfate salts. In some cases, they arise by oxidation of polysulfido complexes, or by binding of sulfur trioxide to sulfido ligands.

Applications
Silver-thiosulfate complexes are produced by common photographic fixers. By dissolving silver halides the fixer stabilises the image. The dissolution process entails reactions involving the formation of 1:2 and 1:3 complexes (X = halide): Fixation involves these chemical reactions (X = halide, typically ):

Sodium aurothiosulfate dihydrate, has been widely discussed in the context of the extraction of gold from its ores. Presently cyanide salts are used on a large scale for this purpose with obvious risks.

Naming
In the IUPAC Red Book the following terms may be used for thiosulfate as a ligand: trioxido-1κ3O-disulfato(S—S)(2−); trioxidosulfidosulfato(2−); thiosulfato; sulfurothioato. In the naming for thiosulfate salts, the final "o" is replaced by "e". Thus, sodium aurothiosulfate could be called trisodium di(thiosulfato)aurate(I).

References

Coordination chemistry
Coordination complexes
Ligands
Thiosulfates